Saša Bajt is a Slovenian scientist and group leader at the Deutsches Elektronen-Synchrotron, where she develops multi-layer mirrors for X-ray application such as Laue lenses.
. She is a regular collaborator of the European XFEL.

Education and career 
Saša Bajt received her B. Sc. in Physics from University of Ljubljana in Slovenia, before pursuing a PhD at the Max Planck Institute for Nuclear Physics and Heidelberg University in Germany. She then joined the University of Chicago as a research scientist, working on X-ray fluorescence microscopy and micro X-ray absorption spectroscopy at the National Synchrotron Light Source (NSLS). She joined Lawrence Livermore National Laboratory where she worked on the development of multilayer mirrors for Extreme ultraviolet lithography and X-ray Free-electron lasers experiments. In 2008, she joined the Deutsches Elektronen Synchrotron (DESY) in Hamburg, Germany as the group leader for X-ray optics in extreme conditions.

She is married to the British physicist Henry N. Chapman.

Awards and Honor 
 2019 Fellow of the Optical Society of America
 2018 Polish Synchrotron Radiation Society Award
 1999 Hawley medal

References

External links
 Saša Bajt homepage – DESY

Living people
Slovenian scientists
Women physicists
Slovenian women scientists
Year of birth missing (living people)
Heidelberg University alumni
University of Ljubljana alumni
Academic staff of the University of Hamburg